Nelson Lake is a lake in Yukon–Koyukuk Census Area, Alaska, United States. It is located in the Brooks Range area of Alaska and is part of the Yukon Flats National Wildlife Refuge.

Name 
Nelson Lake is believed to have been named by cartographer William Yanert, with the name first appearing on a 1916 map he produced of the Yukon Flats region.

References

Lakes of Alaska
Bodies of water of Yukon–Koyukuk Census Area, Alaska